Geoffrey Philip Hayes (19 January 1933 – 9 September 1994) was an Australian politician.

He was born in Melbourne to advertising agent George Hayes and Elsie Irene, and attended school at Murrumbeena and Dandenong. He studied at Melbourne University part-time and became an advertising agent. On 1 September 1956 he married Margaret Lane, with whom he had three sons. In 1967 he was elected to the Victorian Legislative Assembly for Scoresby, transferring to Wantirna in 1976. From 1976 to 1978 he was Minister of Planning and of Housing. He retired in 1982 and subsequently worked as a marketing consultant. Hayes died in 1994.

References

1933 births
1994 deaths
Liberal Party of Australia members of the Parliament of Victoria
Members of the Victorian Legislative Assembly
20th-century Australian politicians